Albert K. Bender (June 16, 1921 – March 29, 2016), author of the 1962 nonfiction book Flying Saucers and the Three Men, was a ufologist. He served in the United States Army Air Forces during World War II. He was obsessed with the UFO phenomenon and became a UFO researcher, founding the International Flying Saucer Bureau. In 1965, he founded the Max Steiner Music Society.

Early life
Albert Bender was born on June 16, 1921, in Duryea, Pennsylvania.  He lived with his stepfather. Bender worked as a factory clerk. He was drawn to the supernatural; he fashioned haunted house decorations and horror movie scenes on his walls. He attended West Pittston High School in West Pittston, Pennsylvania. Bender was even featured in a newspaper article when he was 18 for writing to people all over the world. He wrote letters to correspondents in various countries including Peru, England, Romania and Japan. These letters were up to 20 pages long. His goal was to collect things from different countries, like coins or sand, through writing his correspondences. During high school he was also part of the American Youth League and was elected the Jr. Vice President in January 1941 and was also elected national treasure in October of that same year.

He visited Ottawa, Ontario, Canada for one week in August 1941. He moved from Pennsylvania around 1944. To express his thoughts, he kept a journal and wrote spook plays. Bender was Protestant. Bender enrolled in the United States Army Air Corps during World War II in 1942. He was stationed at Fort George G. Meade as a dental technician and later transferred to Langley, Virginia. He worked there as a clerk for the Dental Center. He also became an editor for an Army newspaper in Langely. He later went to Bridgeport, Connecticut.

After believing to have experienced a supernatural encounter in 1953, he was married on October 18, 1954 to Betty Rose. She believed that she had also been visited by supernatural personages.

Supernatural encounters
He founded the International Flying Saucer Bureau (IFSB) (the first major civilian UFO club in the world) in 1952. Although the organization was a success at first, he suddenly shut it down in 1953.

Bender later told that in March 1953 he had been approached by three men in black. These men visited him in his house and communicated with him telepathically. He received a metal disk from them and instruction. He reported that he felt like he was being transported. These men apparently shared insights into the nature of UFOs. These men shared the origin of UFOs with Bender. Afterwards he became ill and didn't eat for three days. As a result of the visitation, Bender felt encouraged to share what he had seen with other UFO investigators, but was refused. Bender suffered frequent headaches after the three men visited him and his co-workers reported that he seemed scared.

His alleged experiences were recorded in They Knew Too Much About Flying Saucers by Gray Barker, Bender's IFSB associate. Bender's experience formed "the legend of the men in black." Bender did not speak of the event for nine years. In 1962, Bender wrote Flying Saucers and the Three Men to tell his own story. In the book, Bender recounts that the men in black were from another planet. Barker published his book, but there is speculation that Bender's experience was only a dream. Bender went on to manage a motel in California.

Bender was not the first one, however, to report visitations to UFO researchers from men in black. Bender reported that he had a second supernatural encounter. He was visited by three shadowy figures. They did not touch the floor, but hovered above it. They told him that their human appearance was an illusion and that whatever information he told people about their visitation would not be believed. They supposedly told him that they captured people from Earth and used their bodies to disguise themselves.

'SPACE REVIEW'  was the official magazine about ufology news at that time in 1953.
Late in the summer of 1953, Bender made a series of discoveries, which led him to believe that he had finally found the truth to the UFO cover-up. He had planned to reveal his findings in the October issue of the Space Review, but before the issue was published, Bender was visited by three "men dressed in black," who had already read the unpublished report and confirmed his findings. The "silencers" as he called them, scared Bender to the point where he did not publish the report, but left a warning: "We advise those engaged in saucer work to please be very cautious." Bender then suspended publishing on his publication and dissolved the IFSB.

Max Steiner Music Society
Albert K. Bender founded the Max Steiner Music Society in 1965. It was joined by actors John Wayne, Fred Astaire, and Vincent Price. They published a journal and a newsletter. The society officially ended in 1981. Bender has helped locate materials and information about Steiner's career.

Photo gallery

See also
Gray Barker
Morris K. Jessup

References

External links

read ebook version of Flying saucers and three men   website
Albert K. Bender photographs, MSS 2162 at the L. Tom Perry Special Collections, Harold B. Lee Library, Brigham Young University
Bender's obituary information
Recording of Albert K. Bender
News article with a poem dedicated to Albert K. Bender

1921 births
2016 deaths
People from Luzerne County, Pennsylvania
Military personnel from Pennsylvania
American UFO writers
Writers from Pennsylvania
Writers from West Virginia
UFO conspiracy theorists
United States Army Air Forces personnel of World War II
20th-century American non-fiction writers
American conspiracy theorists